Flavius Eutychianus or Eutychian (fl. 388–405) was a politician of the Eastern Roman Empire.

Biography 

Eutychian was the son of the Consul of 361, Taurus; it is known that he had a wife. He should be identified with the character of Typhon in the allegorical work Aegyptus sive de providentia, by Synesius, where he represents the pro-Gothic party; Synesius said that he had a wild and reckless youth. He converted to Arianism, the form of Christianity professed by the Goths.

He was comes sacrarum largitionum; in 388, the rhetor Libanius wrote him to ask a favor regarding a delegation of his own city, Antioch, at the court, and in 390 the same Libanius defines Eutychian as influential at court.

Eutychian was praetorian prefect in 396–397, probably for the prefecture of Illyricum, as attested by some laws of the Theodosian Code and alluded to by Synesius. He was the praetorian prefect of the East from 397 to 399, and in 398 he held the consulate. On the occasion of the fall of Eutropius (summer 399), Eutychian was deposed and replaced by Aurelianus, but after just a year he was back in office at the behest of Gainas, the powerful Gothic magister militum who held in check the Emperor Arcadius; after Gainas fled from Constantinople, however, Eutychian was deposed (July 12, 400).

Between 404 and 405, he was praetorian prefect of the East for a second time.

Notes

Bibliography 
 Jones, Arnold Hugh Martin, John Robert Martindale, John Morris, "Flavius Eutychianus 5", The Prosopography of the Later Roman Empire, volume 1, Cambridge University Press, 1992, pp. 319–321.

4th-century Arian Christians
4th-century Romans
5th-century Arian Christians
5th-century Byzantine people
4th-century Roman consuls
Comites sacrarum largitionum
Imperial Roman consuls
Praetorian prefects of the East
Praetorian prefects of the Illyricum